was a Japanese professional sumo wrestler from Kikuchi, Higo Province. He was the sport's 11th yokozuna. Although the name of the style of the yokozuna'''s in-ring ceremony is named after him, the fact that he himself practiced this style is highly debated.

Early life and career
He was born in March 1825 (in now Kumamoto Prefecture). His grandfather was an ōzeki named Aramaki, who was well known in the neighborhood.In the fall of 1846, he went to Osaka to join Minato stable, because the stablemaster (former yokozuna Shiranui Dakuemon) was also from Kumamoto and powerful within the Osaka Sumo Association. In 1847, he was given the shikona, or ring name, . and started his professional debut in Osaka sumo. His stablemaster realised his potential, and in 1849, he transferred to Sakaigawa stable in Edo-sumo, where he started using the shikona . Shiranui was then recruited to wrestle for the Hosokawa clan. He reached the top makuuchi division in November 1856. He was given the ring name , which was the combination of the name of his former master in Osaka and the name of a Kansei era ōzeki that the Hosokawa lord liked.

Yokozuna
He was promoted to ōzeki in March 1862, but had to withdraw from the 1863 tournament due to an event called the 'Koyanagi murder' (the murder of maegashira ). Shiranui became a yokozuna at the age of 38, even though his record as an ōzeki had not been particularly strong. The granting of the licence was more due to his popularity with the public and long years of service, and the fact that he was close to the Yoshida, which awarded the licences.
His ring-entering performances were so spectacular that a nishiki-e woodblock print of him entering the ring was soon published and sold very well. After his promotion, he did not decline much, and left Edo in November 1869. He became a ringside promoter in Osaka, where he remained until July 1872. His record after his license was 63 wins, 16 losses, 5 holds, 2 draws, and 40 rests. In the top makuuchi division, Shiranui won 119 bouts and lost 35 bouts, recording a winning percentage of 77.3. After retiring from the ring completely, he founded his own stable (under the name ) and led the Osaka Sumo Association as its chairman. Shiranui died in 1879. His grave is located in Ōtsu, Kamimashiki District, Kumamoto.

Yokozuna in-ring ceremony

The name of one style of yokozuna dohyō-iri (the yokozuna ring-entering ceremony) came from him. His ritual style was said to be beautiful, and his ceremony was always a highlight for tournament crowds, sometimes more than the bouts themselves. He continued to perform it for three years after his retirement. However it is unproven that he actually performed what is now called the Shiranui style. In fact, he is considered by most sumo historians today to be the organizer of the Unryū style.
There is a picture of him performing the ceremony holding his arm to his chest, which indicates an Unryū rather than Shiranui style. The 22nd Yokozuna Tachiyama, who was credited as perfecting the Shiranui style (with both arms held out), said his dohyō-iri was based on Unryū Kyūkichi's style. In addition, yokozuna Unryū Kyūkichi, who is said to have developed the Unryū style, is often represented on nishiki-e woodblock prints with his arms expanded, like the current Shiranui style.

Fighting style
Although his performance was not particularly outstanding, he gradually rose in the ranks. Shiranui never won many major victories, but he rose steadily in the ranks and annoyed his opponents with his skill in the right-handed grip.  He was more known for his technique than his strength, he was an expert at leg grabs, once downing Ryōgoku Kajinosuke I, himself an expert on the technique, with one clean move.

 Top division record The actual time the tournaments were held during the year in this period often varied.  
    
    
  
  
    
    
  
  
    
    
  
  
    
    
  
  
    
    
  
  
    
    
  
  
    
    
  
  
    
    
  
  
    
    
  
  
    
    
  
  
    
    
  
  
    
    
  
  
    
    
  
  
    
    
  *Championships for the best record in a tournament were not recognized or awarded before the 1909 summer tournament and the above unofficial championships are historically conferred. For more information see yūshō.''

See also
List of yokozuna
List of past sumo wrestlers
Glossary of sumo terms

References

External links

The 11th Yokozuna Shiranui Koemon
 Shiranui Koemon tournament result

1825 births
1879 deaths
Japanese sumo wrestlers
Sumo people from Kumamoto Prefecture
Yokozuna
19th-century wrestlers